Hostert is a small town in the commune of Niederanven, in central Luxembourg.  , the town has a population of 358.

Niederanven
Towns in Luxembourg